Lamin Jallow (born 22 July 1994) is a Gambian professional footballer who plays as a right winger for Turkish club Keçiörengücü and the Gambia national team.

Club career
Born in Banjul, Jallow has played for Real de Banjul, Chievo Verona, Cittadella, Trapani and Salernitana.

On 31 January 2019, Salernitana bought out his rights from Chievo Verona, after he played for them on loan in the first half of the 2018–19 season, and he signed a four-and-a-half-year contract.

On 30 September 2020, he signed a three-year contract with Vicenza. On 12 August 2021, he joined Fehérvár in Hungary on loan with an option to buy.

On 11 August 2022, Jallow joined Adanaspor in Turkey on a two-year contract.

International career
He made his international debut for Gambia in 2016. He played in the 2021 Africa Cup of Nations, his national team's first continental tournament, where they made the quarter-final.

Personal life 
In November 2020 he tested positive for COVID-19.

Career statistics

International goals
Scores and results list Gambia's goal tally first.

References

1994 births
Living people
Sportspeople from Banjul
Gambian footballers
Association football wingers
Real de Banjul FC players
A.C. ChievoVerona players
A.S. Cittadella players
Trapani Calcio players
A.C. Cesena players
U.S. Salernitana 1919 players
L.R. Vicenza players
Fehérvár FC players
Adanaspor footballers

Serie A players
Serie B players
Serie C players
Nemzeti Bajnokság I players
TFF First League players
The Gambia international footballers
2021 Africa Cup of Nations players
Gambian expatriate footballers
Gambian expatriate sportspeople in Italy
Expatriate footballers in Italy
Gambian expatriate sportspeople in Hungary
Expatriate footballers in Hungary
Gambian expatriate sportspeople in Turkey
Expatriate footballers in Turkey
Ankara Keçiörengücü S.K. footballers